PIRC may refer to:

 Vasja Pirc, chess grandmaster
 Parental Information and Resource Centers, a program in the U.S. Department of Education
 Pensions & Investments Research Consultants, a proxy advisor in the UK
 Police Investigations and Review Commissioner, a public body of the Scottish Government

See also
 Pirc Defence, a chess opening starting with the moves 1. e4 d6